The Abidjan Metro (French: Métro d'Abidjan) is a  rapid transit network under construction serving the Ivorian economic capital of Abidjan. Construction of the network started in November 2017, with the beginning of passenger service originally expected in 2022–2023, but has since been delayed to at least 2025. Initially planned to comprise a single line with 13 stations undertaken by Bouygues-Dongsan, a French-Korean consortium, the project has since then been expanded to a single north–south line with 20 stations, financed 100% by France and built solely by three French groups (Bouygues, through its subsidiaries Bouygues Travaux Publics and Colas Rail, Alstom, and Keolis) after the withdrawal of the South Korean partners from the consortium in October 2017.

Built mostly as an overground and elevated railway in order to avoid more costly tunnels, its automated trains with a driver present in the cabin will be able to run at a top speed of 80 km/h (50 miles/hour) and a maximum frequency of about every 2 minutes. Line 1 of the Abidjan metro is expected to transport 500,000 passengers per day (180 million per year). Construction of line 1 will cost 920 billion CFA francs (1.4 billion euros; 1.7 billion US dollars), entirely financed by France via the French Treasury and the French Development Agency.

In 2018 the Ivorian government was planning for a second line of the Abidjan Metro, an east–west line which would run from Yopougon to Bingerville.

Stations

Line 1 
 Anyama Centre (Anyama is a northern suburb of Abidjan)
 Anyama Sud
 Abobo Nord
 Abobo Intermédiaire
 Abobo Centre
 Abobo Banco
 Abobo Université
 Gare Internationale
 Adjamé Agban
 Adjamé Délégation
 Plateau Centre (the central business district of Abidjan)
 Plateau Lagune
 Treichville
 Treichville Hôpital
 Marcory Canal
 Marcory Centre
 VGE (boulevard named after French president Valéry Giscard d'Estaing)
 Akwaba
 Port-Bouët (a southern suburb of Abidjan)
 Aérocité (at Félix Houphouët-Boigny International Airport)

Anyama Centre, Akwaba, Port-Bouët, and Aérocité stations should open in mid-2023. All other stations should open in mid-2022.

Rolling stock

Alstom Metropolis 
The government has awarded french rolling stock manufacturer Alstom the contract to supply 20 five-car Metropolis trains equipped with CBTC.

References 

Rapid transit in Africa
Transport in Abidjan